Askold Krushelnycky is a journalist.  He was born in London; his Ukrainian parents were refugees due to the Second World War. (Krushelnycky, 2006:14) He is currently a foreign correspondent for The Independent, the Sunday Times and the Chicago Tribune.

In 2006, Krushelnycky published An Orange Revolution: A Personal Journey Through Ukrainian History, which briefly discusses the history of Ukraine and documents its Orange Revolution and the events leading up to it.

References
An Orange Revolution: A Personal Journey Through Ukrainian History by Askold Krushelnycky, Harvill Secker (2006), 360 pages,

External links
Ukraine’s post-orange evolution: Askold Krushelnycky interviewed

Living people
British journalists
Year of birth missing (living people)